CID 72 (Kannada: ಸಿ.ಐ.ಡಿ.೭೨) is a 1973 Indian Kannada film, directed by K. S. L. Swamy and produced by D. R. Naidu. The film stars Srinath, Rajasree, Rajesh and B. V. Radha. The film has musical score by Vijaya Bhaskar.

Cast
Srinath
Rajasree
Rajesh
B. V. Radha
Thoogudeepa Srinivas
Dwarakish

Soundtrack
The music was composed by Vijaya Bhaskar.

References

External links

1973 films
1970s Kannada-language films
Films scored by Vijaya Bhaskar
Films directed by K. S. L. Swamy